Taarka is a Lyons, Colorado-based musical group originally formed in Portland, Oregon in 2001 by the husband/wife team of David Tiller (mandolin) and Enion Pelta-Tiller (violin). The group originally included Jarrod Kaplan on percussion and James Whiton on stand-up bass. Since their departure Taarka has primarily consisted of a rotating membership. Recent Taarka contributors often include Dale Largent on percussion, Daniel Plane on cello, and Troy Robey on bass.

History
In 2000, David Tiller's band, ThaMuseMeant, took a hiatus and Tiller moved to New York City, where he met Enion Pelta through a band called Brooklyn Browngrass. Tiller and Pelta started playing and writing together in early 2001, and the couple soon moved to Oregon. In the coming months, Taarka was formed. 

In 2002, Taarka: Live In the Studio was recorded and released, and although it is currently out of print, it is still available for digital download on iTunes. In 2003, ThaMuseMeant re-formed with a new member: Enion Pelta–Tiller on violin, David Tiller's new wife. In the same year, the Tillers released an acoustic duo album, Man Chasing Woman around Table. On the Frogville Records website, Man Chasing Woman is listed as being out of print, but "maybe available for download soon." 

With 2004 came two new albums, ThaMuseMeant's Silver Seed and Taarka's Even Odd Bird. Even Odd Bird is the oldest album by Taarka that is currently available for sale on their website. After constant touring for several years, Taarka announced in early 2007 that a new album and EP were to be released that year, titled The Trailer and The Martian Picture Soundtrack. Both the EP and the album featured renowned bluegrass fiddler Darol Anger on "The Creepy," a song written by David Tiller, and Joe Craven ("Tutu Tango") and Casey Driessen ("Lonely Woman") were featured on the album. 

Beginning on March 18, 2020, Taarka began hosting live social isolation concerts through Facebook due to the outbreak of the Coronavirus.

Etymology
Taarka answered how the name "Taarka" came about on their website.

Band members
David Tiller - Mandolin, Guitars, Vocals, Bass, Bouzouki
Enion Pelta–Tiller - Violins, Vocals

Discography

Albums

References

External links 
 Taarka's official site
 Facebook
 Official MySpace
 Taarka on Frogville Records

Musical groups from Portland, Oregon
Musical groups from Colorado
Musical groups established in 2001
American street performers
Jam bands
American folk rock groups
2001 establishments in Oregon